The Bugs Bunny Birthday Blowout, known in Japan and on the title screen as  and in Europe as The Bugs Bunny Blowout, is a platform video game developed and published by Kemco for the Nintendo Entertainment System in 1990.

Plot
It is Bugs Bunny's 50th birthday anniversary. However, his friends, who were not invited, feel envious and decide to prevent Bugs from getting to his birthday party. By the time Bugs reaches his house, it turns out that his friends were playing tricks on him to stall him until they got his party ready.

Gameplay
The game is a side-scrolling platform game where players control Bugs Bunny on a quest to get to his 50th birthday party. He is armed with a mallet that he can swing at various enemies to defeat them, deflect certain projectiles or destroy bricks. He can also collect hearts to restore his health and carrots for bonus points. He can also land on top of enemies without getting damaged. At the end of most levels, Bugs Bunny has to use his mallet to defeat a Warner Brothers cartoon character, such as Foghorn Leghorn, Sylvester, or the Tasmanian Devil. These other Looney Tunes characters are trying to stop Bugs because they are all jealous that Bugs gets all the attention. Many of them can be damaged with the mallet or their own projectiles, but Daffy Duck can only be avoided in order to reach a carrot that takes him to the next level. Despite appearing on the cover,  Porky Pig does not appear in the game. The gameplay is very similar to Super Mario Bros. 2, another game for NES.

At the end of each level, Bugs can play a minigame, which allows him to earn extra lives. The total amount he can earn is 99. Despite the name on the packaging, the North American and European releases retain the game's Japanese title, Happy Birthday Bugs, on the game's title screen.

Reception
It received average to positive reviews. Spanish magazine Super Juegos gave the game 72.6. Brazilian magazine VideoGame gave the game four out of five stars. French magazine Joypad gave the game 80%. Italian magazine Consolemania gave it 77.

References

External links

1990 video games
Side-scrolling video games
Kemco games
Platform games
Seika Corporation games
Nintendo Entertainment System games
Nintendo Entertainment System-only games
Single-player video games
Video games featuring Bugs Bunny
Video games featuring Daffy Duck
Video games featuring Sylvester the Cat
Video games featuring the Tasmanian Devil (Looney Tunes)
Video games about birthdays
Video games developed in Japan
Warner Bros. video games